Miller Township is one of the twenty-two townships of Knox County, Ohio, United States.  The 2010 census found 1,006 people in the township.

Geography
Located in the southern part of the county, it borders the following townships:
Clinton Township - north
Pleasant Township - northeast
Morgan Township - east
Burlington Township, Licking County - south
Bennington Township, Licking County - southwest corner
Milford Township - west
Liberty Township - northwest corner

No municipalities are located in Miller Township.

Name and history
Miller Township was named for James Miller, a pioneer settler who gave elections officials five and one half gallons of whiskey to secure the honor.  It is the only Miller Township statewide.

Miller Township was originally built up chiefly by settlers from Vermont and Rhode Island.

Government

The township is governed by a three-member board of trustees, who are elected in November of odd-numbered years to a four-year term beginning on the following January 1. Two are elected in the year after the presidential election and one is elected in the year before it. There is also an elected township fiscal officer, who serves a four-year term beginning on April 1 of the year after the election, which is held in November of the year before the presidential election. Vacancies in the fiscal officership or on the board of trustees are filled by the remaining trustees.

References

External links
County website

Townships in Knox County, Ohio
Townships in Ohio